Chris Kimberly Goode (born September 17, 1963) is a former American football defensive back who played with the National Football League (NFL)'s Indianapolis Colts. Goode was drafted by the Colts in the 1987 NFL Draft out of Alabama.

He recorded 2 sacks and 7 interceptions in his NFL career. In 1990, he returned a fumble 54 yards for a touchdown against the Miami Dolphins.
Chris is the oldest of three brothers that would all eventually play football at The University of Alabama. He is also the first Goode brother to lead Town Creek's Hazlewood High School to a state championship during his senior year in 1981.

During that state championship season, Chris rushed for 1,528 yards and intercepted 11 passes. As impressive as those stats were, the senior did it while sharing time with his brother Kerry and other running backs. In one of these games, Goode compiled 269 yards on just six carries

Like his brothers, Chris’s talent was not limited to the football field. Goode was a versatile player on the basketball court and won a track championship his junior year where he set a state hurdles record only to be broken by his brother, Pierre, several years later.

Chris signed with the University of North Alabama out of high school in 1982, but transferred to the Crimson Tide after one year as a UNA running back.

Family

Chris' brothers Clyde, Pierre, and former NFL running back Kerry Goode all starred at the University of Alabama, and he is a cousin of former NFL player Antonio Langham, also a former Crimson Tide star.

References

1963 births
Living people
People from Town Creek, Alabama
Players of American football from Alabama
American football cornerbacks
Alabama Crimson Tide football players
Indianapolis Colts players
Coaches of American football from Alabama
North Alabama Lions football coaches